The  Philadelphia Soul season was the eighth season for the franchise in the Arena Football League. The team was coached by Clint Dolezel and played their home games at the Wells Fargo Center. The Soul captured another division championship, and went on to reach the ArenaBowl for the second consecutive season. However, they were once again defeated by the Arizona Rattlers in ArenaBowl XXVI by a 48–39 score.

Final roster

Standings

Schedule

Regular season
The Soul began the season on the road against the Arizona Rattlers on March 23, in a rematch of ArenaBowl XXV. Their first home game was on April 20 when they faced the Cleveland Gladiators. They closed the regular season on July 27, on the road against the San Antonio Talons.

Playoffs

References

Philadelphia Soul
Philadelphia Soul seasons
Philadelphia Soul